The Chinese Ambassador to Sri Lanka is the official representative of the People's Republic of China to the Democratic Socialist Republic of Sri Lanka.

List of representatives

See also
China–Sri Lanka relations

References 

 
Sri Lanka
China